Land of Wanted Men is a 1931 American Western film directed by Harry L. Fraser and starring Bill Cody, Sheila Bromley and Gibson Gowland.

Cast
 Bill Cody as Silent Saunders  
 Andy Shuford as Mickey  
 Sheila Bromley as Cynthia 
 Gibson Gowland as Terry  
 Jack Richardson as Thorpe  
 Frank Lackteen as Lonie  
 James A. Marcus as Judge

References

Bibliography
 Pitts, Michael R. Western Movies: A Guide to 5,105 Feature Films. McFarland, 2012.

External links
 

1931 films
1931 Western (genre) films
1930s English-language films
American Western (genre) films
Monogram Pictures films
Films directed by Harry L. Fraser
American black-and-white films
Films with screenplays by Harry L. Fraser
1930s American films